This is a list showing the most populous cities in the province of Gilgit-Baltistan, Pakistan.

List

References 

Gilgit-Baltistan
Gilgit-Baltistan

Cities